Keyboardd Sonata No. 34 (Haydn) may refer to:
Piano Sonata Hob. XVI/33, L. 34, in D major
Piano Sonata Hob. XVI/34, L. 53, in E minor